Procession: An Aural History 1981-2010 is a compilation album by American post-punk band Savage Republic, released on September 7, 2010 by LTM Recordings. The release included selected material from all of the band's studio albums, including tracks from EPs and singles. The two-disc edition comes with a live performance of the band in Spain on January 30, 2010.

Track listing
All songs composed by Savage Republic, except "Viva la Rock 'N' Roll" by Alternative TV.

References

External links
Savage Republic at LTM Recordings
[ Procession: An Aural History entry at allmusic]

2010 compilation albums
2010 live albums
Savage Republic albums